is an area in the Minami Ward of Sakai, Osaka and Izumi, Osaka, Japan. With an area of 1,557 hectares, its population is about 150,000. Sections of the New Town include Izumigaoka (population about 67,000), Toga (population about 39,000) and Komyoike (population about 36,000). The area is served by the Semboku Rapid Railway.

Notes

References
 

Geography of Osaka Prefecture
New towns in Japan
New towns started in the 1960s
Izumi, Osaka
Sakai, Osaka